Benjamin Javaux (3 March 1894 – 17 October 1953) was a Belgian racing cyclist. He rode in the 1921 Tour de France.

References

1894 births
1953 deaths
Belgian male cyclists
Place of birth missing